William Gibson, 2nd Baron Ashbourne (16 December 1868 – 21 January 1942), was an Irish language activist and author.

Life
Born in Dublin, to Edward Gibson, 1st Baron Ashbourne, and Frances Maria Adelaide Colles (a granddaughter of Abraham Colles and niece of John Dawson Mayne), Gibson was educated at Harrow School, Trinity College, Dublin, and Merton College, Oxford University. He succeeded to the title of 2nd Baron Ashbourne, of Ashbourne, County Meath, in 1913 and held the office of Justice of the Peace for County Dublin and County Meath. He was a founder of the Roger Bacon Society and Vice-President of the Irish Literary Society. He was the author of The Abbe de Lammenais and the Liberal Catholic Movement in France and was a contributor to The Dublin and other reviews. In 1896, he married Marianne de Monbrison (died 1953), daughter of Henri Roger Conquerré de Monbrison of Paris, a French Protestant from the Languedoc. Marianne's sister was married to Count Edmond de Poutales. Lord and Lady Ashbourne left no children.

Gibson was an enthusiastic cultural nationalist and converted to Catholicism. He adopted Irish dress and was a member of the Gaelic League. He spoke French rather than English to those who did not speak Irish. He occasionally spoke Irish in the House of Lords, though it was remarked "The House of Lords was in England, and what good was it for him to talk Irish to Englishmen while the Irish people of Galway spoke English to one another?"

His father had left £100,000 in his will, and though "Willie" was the eldest son and heir, because of his nationalist leanings, he was left with only a "paltry" £800, the bulk having been passed to his younger brother, Edward Gibson (1873–1928), father of the third Baron Ashbourne.

Mary Leslie, a member of the family of the Leslie family of Glaslough, Monaghan, said of Lord Ashbourne:"I am so interested by the Ashbourne's son, a half hatched philosopher & saint who has an article in this 19th Century & is writing on "Danton" for the next. He has the eyes of a Melancthon but the mouth & wit of a Paddy. He was a positivist before he turned Catholic. He has the worst clothes of any philosopher I've met..."

In spite of his Irish Nationalist leanings, he lived near Dorking, Surrey, before he and his wife moved to France, where they lived at Compagnie, where he died. On the back of a letter that he wrote to his wife in 1937, he wrote the opening lines of a poem:"I turned away, my soul was rich with sadness, And wondered thence in brooding reverie..."

Publications
The Abbe de Lamennais and the liberal Catholic movement in France, 1896.

Arms

References

External links
 National Portrait Gallery
 Portrait of William Gibson, 2nd Baron Ashbourne

1868 births
1942 deaths
Converts to Roman Catholicism from Anglicanism
Writers from Dublin (city)
People educated at Harrow School
Alumni of Trinity College Dublin
Alumni of Merton College, Oxford
2
British expatriates in France
People from Dorking